Godrej Properties Limited is a real estate company with its head office in Mumbai, India. A subsidiary of Godrej Industries Ltd, the company was established in 1990 under the leadership of Adi Godrej. The company is currently developing projects that are estimated to cover more than 89.7 million square feet. Currently, Godrej Properties Limited(GPL) is listed on the Bombay Stock Exchange (BSE) and the National Stock Exchange (NSE). It operates in Chandigarh, Gurgaon, Ahmedabad, Kolkata, Nagpur, Mumbai, Pune, Hyderabad, Mangalore, Noida, Bengaluru, Chennai and Kochi.

Projects 
Godrej BKC
Planet Godrej
Godrej Garden City, Ahmedabad

References

External links

Real estate and property developers
Real estate companies of India
Real estate companies based in Mumbai
Godrej Group
Indian companies established in 1990
1990 establishments in Maharashtra
Real estate companies established in 1990
Companies listed on the National Stock Exchange of India
Companies listed on the Bombay Stock Exchange